The Gus Weilermann House, located southwest of Paris, Idaho, was listed on the National Register of Historic Places in 1982.

The house was deemed architecturally significant "for the distinctive contrast of its mansard form and its rural setting. It has added architectural and historical significance for its resemblance to the now-lost house of Jacob Tueller, Sr., whose family was responsible for the masonry. The Tueller house was also L-shaped with identical disposition of openings, including the gabled upper door."

References

Houses on the National Register of Historic Places in Idaho
Second Empire architecture in Idaho
Houses completed in 1890
Bear Lake County, Idaho